White Comb may be a misspelling of:
White Combe, a hill in England
White Coomb, a hill in Scotland